Daniel I. Okimoto (born 1942) is a Japanese-American academic and political scientist.

Early life
Okimoto was born at the Santa Anita Assembly Center during the early stages of the World War II Internment of Japanese Americans.  As an infant, he was sent along with his family to the Poston War Relocation Center in Arizona as part of the enforcement of Executive Order 9066.

Okimoto graduated cum laude from Princeton University in 1965; and his postgraduate studies at Harvard University earned a master's degree in 1967.  He continued his studies at the University of Tokyo from 1968 through 1970.  His Ph.D. in political sciences was conferred by the University of Michigan in 1975.

Academic career
Okimoto is a Professor Emeritus in the Department of Political Science at Stanford University.  He is also Director Emeritus and co-founder of the Walter H. Shorenstein Asia/Pacific Research Center (APARC) at Stanford University. Shorenstein APARC is part of the Freeman Spogli Institute for International Studies (FSI) at Stanford University.

Selected works

 1988 -- The Japan-American Security Alliance: Prospect for the Twenty-First Century.  	Stanford: Asia/Pacific Research Center, Institute for International Studies, Stanford University. 
 1984 -- Competitive Edge: the Semiconductor Industry in the U.S. and Japan with Takuo Sugano, Franklin B. Weinstein, M. Thérèse Flaherty.  Stanford: Stanford University Press. ;  OCLC 10640450
 1971 -- American in Disguise. New York: Walker/Weatherhill. ;

Honors
 Order of the Rising Sun, Gold Rays with Neck Ribbon, 2007.
 Prime Minister's Commendation, 2004.

Notes

References
 Okimoto, Daniel I. (1971). American in Disguise. 	New York: Walker/Weatherhill. ;

External links

1942 births
Living people
Princeton University alumni
Harvard University alumni
American political scientists
University of Michigan alumni
Stanford University Department of Political Science faculty
Recipients of the Order of the Rising Sun, 3rd class
American academics of Japanese descent
American writers of Japanese descent
Japanese-American internees